Eric Watson may refer to:

Eric Watson (businessman) (born 1959), New Zealand businessman
Eric Watson (cricketer) (1925–2017), New Zealand cricketer and national rugby union team coach
Eric Watson (footballer) (1893–1971), Australian rules footballer
Eric Watson (musician) (born 1955), American jazz pianist and composer
Eric Watson (photographer) (1955–2012), British photographer
Eric Watson (politician), Republican member of the Tennessee House of Representatives
Eric Vernon Watson, British bryologist